is an actor and model. Oyamada began her career in Japan. She is currently based in New York City and Tokyo.

Life and career

Sayuri Oyamada was born in Niigata, Japan. She made her acting debut in 2000, acting for director Junko Wada in Body Drop Asphalt, accruing widespread acclaim in Japan and globally. In 2010, Oyamada ventured to New York to expand her international career having been selected by the Ministry of Culture to represent the Japanese entertainment community in an elite cultural exchange program. In the last several years, Oyamada has spent her time between Tokyo, Los Angeles, and New York. She is currently based in New York and Tokyo.

Oyamada's professional work includes critically acclaimed films produced in Japan and internationally, including leads in Bright Future (2003), Seventh Anniversary (2003) Miracle Banana (2005) (Haiti), Suki Da (2006), Watashi Dasuwa (2009), Insect Detective Yoshimi Yoshida (2010). In 2016, Oyamada played the leading role of Aya in While the Women Are Sleeping (女が眠る時) directed by Wayne Wang  and also starring Takeshi Kitano, Hidetoshi Nishijima, and Shiori Kutsuna premiered at the 66th Annual Berlin International Film Festival.

Oyamada's newest trilogy of theatrical projects includes leading roles in Bashira directed by Academy Award winner Nickson Fong, a short directed by Govind Rae, and a supporting role in the Japanese feature, Lady in White directed by Yuki Otsuka. All three were due for release in 2019.

Oyamada's Japan-based commercial work includes Bridgestones "Good Winter" television campaign and work for brands such as Docomo, Sony, Lion and others. She has been featured in commercials in the United States for such brands as Cadillac, Shiseido feat. Lady Gaga, Apple Watch, IBM Think, Audible (Amazon), and Keurig.

Filmography

Theatre

References

External links

Living people
20th-century Japanese actresses
21st-century Japanese actresses
Japanese film actresses
Japanese performance artists
Japanese stage actresses
Japanese television actresses
People from Niigata (city)
Year of birth missing (living people)